Drawing may refer to:

Visual arts
 Drawing,  a visual art that involves marking a two-dimensional medium
 Technical drawing, drawings with greater precision for engineering
 Rasterizing, the act of drawing primitives into a bitmap image in computer graphics
 Google Drawings diagram and chart editor

Music
 "Drawing" (Barenaked Ladies song), 2008
 "Drawing", an instrumental song by Linkin Park from LP Underground 9: Demos

Other uses
 Drawing (manufacturing), a metalworking process
 Wire drawing
 Drawing money or dividends from a company or financial institution
 Special drawing rights from the IMF
 Drawing (poker), having a hand that needs further cards to become valuable
 Taking a playing card from the deck
 Disemboweling or dragging, in the Medieval English punishment hanged, drawn and quartered

See also
 Drawing straws
 DrawingML
 Sortition - drawing lots